Acrobasis africanella is a species of snout moth in the genus Acrobasis. It was described by Boris Balinsky in 1994 and is found in South Africa.

References

Moths described in 1994
Acrobasis
Insects of South Africa
Moths of Africa